Kelsey May Cottrell (born 31 May 1990) is an Australian international lawn bowler.

Bowls career

World Championships
Cottrell won three medals at the 2008 World Outdoor Bowls Championship in Christchurch, New Zealand. Four years later she won the gold medal in the pairs competition with Rebecca Quail and a team gold at the 2012 World Outdoor Bowls Championship.

In 2016, Cottrell was part of the fours team with Natasha Scott, Rebecca Van Asch and Carla Krizanic who won the gold medal at the 2016 World Outdoor Bowls Championship in Christchurch, in addition to a team gold.

In 2020 she was selected for the 2020 World Outdoor Bowls Championship in Australia.

Commonwealth Games
Cottrell competed in the 2010 Commonwealth Games where she won a bronze medal in the singles. Four years later she won a silver in the triples at the 2014 Commonwealth Games.

Cottrell was part of the Australian team for the 2018 Commonwealth Games on the Gold Coast in Queensland where she claimed another gold medal in the Fours with Krizanic, Scott and Van Asch once again.

She was a batonbearer for the 2022 Commonwealth Games Queen's Baton Relay when the baton came to Broadbeach Bowls Club in Gold Coast in March 2022.

International
Cottrell has won nine medals at the Asia Pacific Bowls Championships. The medal haul includes four gold medals, the latest at the 2019 Asia Pacific Bowls Championships in the Gold Coast, Queensland. Cottrell has won the Hong Kong International Bowls Classic pairs title three times, twice with Julie Keegan (2009, 2010) and once with Carla Odgers (2013).

National
Although born in Auckland she became the third overseas player to have won the singles title at the New Zealand National Bowls Championships when bowling as an invitational player in 2015/16.

In 2018 she won the pairs title at the Australian National Bowls Championships and in 2021, she won her 7th & 8th Australian Open crown, this time in the pairs and fours. A second national title was won in 2021 (in the pairs).

References

1990 births
Living people
Bowls players at the 2010 Commonwealth Games
Bowls players at the 2014 Commonwealth Games
Bowls players at the 2018 Commonwealth Games
Commonwealth Games medallists in lawn bowls
Commonwealth Games gold medallists for Australia
Commonwealth Games silver medallists for Australia
Commonwealth Games bronze medallists for Australia
Australian female bowls players
Bowls World Champions
21st-century Australian women
Medallists at the 2010 Commonwealth Games
Medallists at the 2014 Commonwealth Games
Medallists at the 2018 Commonwealth Games